Edward Cornwall Lee (18 June 1877 – 16 June 1942) was an English first-class cricketer. Lee was a right-handed batsman who bowled right-arm fast-medium.

Lee was educated at Winchester College, where he represented the college cricket team in two matches against Eton College, before moving up to Oxford University.

Lee made his first-class debut for Hampshire in the 1896 County Championship against Yorkshire at St George's Road, Harrogate. Lee played 46 first-class matches for Hampshire between 1896 and 1909, with his final match for Hampshire coming in the 1909 season against the touring Australians at the County Ground, Southampton. In Lee's 46 first-class matches for the county he scored 994 runs at a batting average of 14.61, with two half centuries and a high score of 54* against Yorkshire in 1901. With the ball, Lee took 2 wickets for the county at a bowling average of 74.77, with best figures of 2/0. In the field Ward took 26 catches.

Lee went up to University College, Oxford, in 1896. In the 1897 season he made his debut for Oxford University against the Marylebone Cricket Club at Lord's. Lee played 18 first-class matches for Oxford University between 1897 and 1900, with his final match for the University coming in the 1900 season against Sussex. In Lee's 18 first-class matches for the University he scored 322 runs at a batting average of 12.88, with a single half centuries and a career high score of 66* against Sussex in 1898. With the ball, Lee took 29 wickets for the University at a bowling average of 17.65, with two five wicket hauls and career best figures of 6/42 against the Marylebone Cricket Club in 1908. In the field Lee took 17 catches for the University. For his time playing for the University, Lee was awarded an Oxford Blue.

In 1901 Lee made his debut for the Marylebone Cricket Club, who he would play 7 first-class matches for from 1901–1903 and 1906–1909, with his final first-class match for the club coming against Oxford University in 1909.

In addition, Lee toured the West Indies with RA Bennett's XI in 1902, making his debut on tour against Barbados. Lee played 13 first-class matches on tour, with his final tour match coming against British Guiana. In his 13 tour matches, Lee scored 224 runs at a batting average of 12.44, with one half century score of 53 against Jamaica Born.

Lee played a total of 85 first-class matches, scoring 1,764 runs at a batting average of 14.22. Lee made four half centuries with a high score of 66*. Lee took a total of 39 wickets at a bowling average of 32.15, with two five wicket hauls and best figures of 6/42. An able fielder, Lee took 59 catches.

Lee died at Petersfield, Hampshire on 16 June 1942.

Family
Lee's son Arthur Lee also played first-class cricket for Hampshire, Oxford University and the Marylebone Cricket Club.

References

External links
Edward Lee at Cricinfo
Edward Lee at CricketArchive
Matches and detailed statistics for Edward Lee

1877 births
1942 deaths
Sportspeople from Torquay
People educated at Winchester College
Alumni of University College, Oxford
English cricketers
Hampshire cricketers
Oxford University cricketers
Marylebone Cricket Club cricketers
Oxford University Past and Present cricketers
R. A. Bennett's XI cricketers